Hervé Mamadou Lamizana (born January 22, 1981) is a former Ivorian professional basketball player who also has French citizenship.

College career
Lamizana played for the St. Patrick's basketball team in high school in Elizabeth, New Jersey, for Rutgers University in college. He was not selected in the NBA Draft. In the 2003–04 season at Rutgers he achieved 102 blocks and pulled down 252 rebounds.

Professional career
His first professional team was in Turkey with Türk Telekom Ankara, with whom he played in 2004. Later that season, he moved to Israel and played for Hapoel Galil Elyon.

He played in Israel in the next season with Hapoel Tel Aviv, after starting the season for the Anyang KT&G Kites in South Korea.

In 2006, he moved to China and played for the Shandong Lions.

In 2011 and 2012, he played in Puerto Rico with teams Indios de Mayagüez and Vaqueros de Bayamón.

During 2013, Herve played for the Yulon Luxgen Dinos of the Super Basketball League, the professional basketball league in Taiwan. He was named MVP in the month of January, 2013 after averaging 20.7 points, 12.2 rebounds, 3.2 blocks, and leading his team to a 4-2 record.

In September 2014, he signed with Halcones UV Xalapa of Mexico. The next month, he left Halcones after appearing in only five league games. In February 2015, he re-signed with Yulon Dinos of Taiwan. In April 2015, he signed with Trotamundos de Carabobo of Venezuela for the rest of the 2015 LPB season. In June 2015, he signed with Reales de La Vega of Dominican Republic. In March 2016 he signed with Al Mouttahed Tripoli of Lebanon. He currently plays for Yulon Luxgen Dinos in Taiwan.

References

External links
NBA draft 2004 Profile
FIBA.com Profile

1981 births
Living people
2010 FIBA World Championship players
Air21 Express players
Anyang KGC players
Expatriate basketball people in Israel
French men's basketball players
French expatriate basketball people in the United States
French expatriate sportspeople in Turkey
Halcones de Xalapa players
Hapoel Galil Elyon players
Hapoel Tel Aviv B.C. players
Israeli Basketball Premier League players
Ivorian expatriate sportspeople in Chile
Ivorian expatriate sportspeople in the Dominican Republic
Ivorian expatriate sportspeople in Israel
Ivorian expatriate sportspeople in Mexico
Ivorian expatriate basketball people in the Philippines
Ivorian expatriate sportspeople in South Korea
Ivorian expatriate sportspeople in Taiwan
Ivorian expatriate sportspeople in Turkey
Ivorian expatriate sportspeople in the United States
Ivorian expatriate sportspeople in Venezuela
Ivorian men's basketball players
Parade High School All-Americans (boys' basketball)
Philippine Basketball Association imports
Power forwards (basketball)
Rutgers Scarlet Knights men's basketball players
San-en NeoPhoenix players
Shandong Hi-Speed Kirin players
Sichuan Blue Whales players
Sportspeople from Abidjan
The Patrick School alumni
Tianjin Pioneers players
Trotamundos B.B.C. players
Türk Telekom B.K. players
Expatriate basketball people in Taiwan
Taiwan Beer basketball players
Yulon Luxgen Dinos players
Super Basketball League imports